The 1977–78 Yorkshire Football League was the 52nd season in the history of the Yorkshire Football League, a football competition in England.

Division One

Division One featured 12 clubs which competed in the previous season, along with four new clubs, promoted from Division Two:
Farsley Celtic
Frecheville Community Association
Sheffield
Tadcaster Albion

League table

Map

Division Two

Division Two featured eight clubs which competed in the previous season, along with seven new clubs.
Clubs relegated from Division One:
Hatfield Main
Liversedge
Pickering Town
Clubs promoted from Division Three:
Bentley Victoria Welfare
Brook Sports
Collingham
Fryston Colliery Welfare

League table

Map

Division Three

Division Three featured eleven clubs which competed in the previous season, along with five new clubs.
Clubs relegated from Division Two:
Rawmarsh Welfare
Selby Town
Woolley Miners Welfare
Yorkshire Amateur
Plus:
Harworth Colliery Institute, joined from Sheffield Association League

League table

Map

League Cup

Final

References

1977–78 in English football leagues
Yorkshire Football League